La morte di Cesare (The Death of Caesar) is an opera seria in three acts by Francesco Bianchi. The libretto was by Gaetano Sertor, after Shakespeare's play Julius Caesar.

La morte di Cesare was one of six texts that Sertor wrote for Bianchi, influencing a popular series of Venetian 'morte' operas in the 1790s. While the murder itself  was not shown on the stage, the audience were left with the body of Caesar conspicuously in view during the closing scenes. 

As with other Bianchi operas, there were innovations: the chorus participated actively in the drama, there was a ballet and a pantomime, a duet for two men, and a final oath scene (giuramento), besides the basically unconventional tragic ending.

Performance history
The opera was first performed at the Teatro San Samuele in Venice on 27 December 1788.

Roles

Synopsis
The subject of the opera is the conspiracy, led by Cassio, Bruto and Porzia, to murder Giulio Cesare (Julius Caesar) in Rome in 44 BC. Giulio Cesare's loving relationship with Calfurnia forms a subplot.

References

McClymonds, Marita P (1992), Morte di Cesare, La in The New Grove Dictionary of Opera, ed. Stanley Sadie (London) 
McClymonds, Marita P (1992), 'Sertor, Gaetano' in The New Grove Dictionary of Opera, ed. Stanley Sadie (London) 

Opera seria
Operas by Francesco Bianchi
1788 operas
Italian-language operas
Operas
Operas based on works by William Shakespeare
Depictions of Julius Caesar in opera
Works based on Julius Caesar (play)